Atlantis Events is an LGBT vacation company that provides LGBT cruises and resort vacations. A 2017 book on LGBT tourism described it as "the most successful LGBT tour operator in the world". Their vacations are designed and marketed primarily for gay men.

History
Atlantis Events was founded in 1991 to organize resort vacations, beginning with an event at the Club Med resort at Playa Blanca in Costa Careyes, Jalisco, Mexico. The company began chartering cruise ships in 1998. In October 2007, Atlantis acquired competitor RSVP Vacations from RSVP's parent company, PlanetOut.

The company's tours have sometimes experienced negative reactions from anti-gay officials at their destinations. In December 1997, an Atlantis Events cruise on Norwegian Cruise Line's MS Leeward was denied permission make a planned February 1998 stop at Grand Cayman. Caymanian official Thomas C. Jefferson wrote to the cruise line that the cruise's passengers would not "uphold the standards of appropriate behavior expected of visitors". The ship docked in Belize instead. In September 2000, Turkish police blocked Atlantis guests from visiting the Aegean resort town Kuşadası, after the ship was already docked.

Destinations
Typical cruise itineraries for Atlantis are to the Caribbean, the Mediterranean, the Pacific coast of Mexico, and Australia. Typical locations for land resort vacations are Mexico and the Caribbean. Other destinations – which have included cruises in areas such as Alaska, Asia, and the Baltic, and land vacations in Las Vegas and Kenya – are offered less frequently.

See also
 LGBT marketing

References

External links

Companies based in West Hollywood, California
LGBT tourism
Transport companies established in 1991
Travel and holiday companies of the United States
1991 establishments in California